Tees Maar Khan  is a 2010 Indian Hindi-language heist comedy film directed by Farah Khan, written by Ashmith Kunder and producer-editor Shirish Kunder who also composed the title track and background score, and produced by Twinkle Khanna and Ronnie Screwvala under UTV Motion Pictures, Hari Om Entertainment and Three's Company. A remake of the 1966 Italian film After the Fox, whose story was adapted by Shirish, the film stars Akshay Kumar, Akshaye Khanna and Katrina Kaif in the lead roles. Salman Khan and Anil Kapoor make special appearances.

Tees Maar Khan was released worldwide on 24 December 2010, during Christmas. The film was a moderate commercial success at the box office, and is today primarily remembered for Kaif's dance number Sheila Ki Jawani. The theatrical trailer and title song of the film were released on UTV Motion Pictures' YouTube channel on 4 August 2010 for promotional purposes. The trailer was premiered in theatres with Vipul Amrutlal Shah's romantic comedy Action Replayy, also starring Kumar, and Rohit Shetty's action comedy Golmaal 3 on 5 November 2010. Featuring music composed by Vishal-Shekhar, the film received mixed reviews.

Plot
Commissioner Khadak Singh is addressing an assembly of police officers, among whom is his junior accomplice, Inspector Jagtap, over an occasion to celebrate the recovery of antique artifacts. Singh has his suspicion set on the Johri brothers, two Siamese twins, who have been in the eyes of the Interpol. However, as he explains, while Singh has the responsibility of transporting these artifacts to Delhi without any interruptions, he is clear that the Johri brothers will desperately find a way out, but each of the possible talented con artists and thieves they might choose has been ruled out through Singh's efforts, and at that moment, he receives and spreads the word that the third and final con artist, wanted criminal Tabrez Mirza Khan, a.k.a. Tees Maar Khan, a.k.a. TMK, has been arrested at an airport in Paris, and is being brought to India.  (The original "Tees Maar Khan", meaning "thirty tigers prince", was Mir Mahbub Ali Khan (1866–1911), the sixth Nizam of Hyderabad, who killed 33 tigers.)

While in the process of being deported back to India to be produced before the police and ultimately be sent to prison, Tabrez, completely handcuffed, is picked up by CBI officers Chatterjee and Mukherjee, who warns him that he won't be able to escape from prison a 26th time around, but he laughs it off, claiming that he will go home and not to prison. Aboard the flight is aviation minister Pankaj Shukla's daughter Malavika, who gets into an argument with one of the flight attendants over the issue of her pet, Penny. The chief pilot tries to intervene but fails to settle the friction between the two. Tabrez uses this to his advantage by first jacking the cockpit on the pretext of using the washroom and later pushing an asleep Chatterjee's leg out of the seat, which results in the attendant unwittingly losing control and spilling a drink over Penny, causing Malavika to burst into anger, while the pilots come out to resolve the dispute, and discover, to the horror of both themselves and unwittingly the passengers as well, that the flight has been left in autopilot mode, and since the door is jammed, the flight could possibly crash land. The ensuing commotion results in a middle-aged woman aboard the flight seeking out Chatterjee and Mukherjee for help, but in the officers' audacity to refuse, Chatterjee ends up unwittingly exclaiming loudly that Tabrez can open the lock. However, when Tabrez initially rebuffs the requests of the passengers, they, in all ire, free Tabrez from the two officers, and he, in turn, manages to open the cockpit for the pilots, thereby becoming a hero in the eyes of the passengers and is able to trick the police by poising, all dressed up, as a rich man.

Shortly after he relays this entire episode to his sidekicks Burger, Dollar and Soda, who have come to pick him up at the airport, Tabrez drives away and expresses his desire to go home and meet his mother and his wife, Aanya Khan, but Burger reveals that Aanya isn't at home and has been shooting for a film titled "Sheila Ki Jawani". Tabrez, visibly irked, decides to hijack the film's shooting, and in the process, smashes the director on his head and drags her home. Aanya protests, nearly exposing Tabrez in front of his mother, who is under the impression that he is a renowned film director himself. Chatterjee and Mukherjee appear at his house, but are thrown out by his mother and Aanya.

Tabrez next makes a deal with the Johri brothers to hijack the train with the help of a few unwitting villagers, who he is supposed to trick into doing so and smuggling the goods into a truck for the brothers, by posing as an international film director. During one of the two meetings in which this is finalized, well known superstar Aatish Kapoor arrives as a guest of honour at the local dandiya event where Tabrez and the Johri brothers are randomly chosen for the prize, but they are spotted by Chatterjee and Mukherjee and instead decide to flee by creating a commotion, causing Aatish to storm out in anger. Tabrez finds that Aatish enjoys police protection and relays this information to the Johri brothers, who decide that they will be the producers.

Tabrez, Dollar, Burger and Soda manage to steal equipment from a film set where actor Chunky Pandey is shooting, and land up in a village called Dhulia, where the chief, Nana Ghanpule and his blind associate, Subedaar welcome him. Realizing that the train passes through the only track in Dhulia, Tabrez settles on the idea of directing his film there, and, posing as an international director Manoj "Day" Ramalin the fair complexioned brother of award-winning director Manoj "Night" Ramalin, approaches Aatish, who agrees to the "Oscar-winning" project, despite the suspicions of his manager Bunty Baweja.

Tabrez comes up with the idea of a film centred in the pre-independence era, where Aatish would play a revolutionary, and Aanya would play "Razia Sultana", and both of them would protest against Britishers. Midway through, the negatives run out, and one of Nana's associates (Shashi Kiran) overhears this, deciding to raise a few 5-6 lakhs of rupees for Tabrez and the team. At night, since they have the keys to the local bank, Tabrez, Burger, Dollar, and Soda decide to rob the bank, but even as the villagers "mistakenly" assume them to be robbers, their escape and attempts to dodge a ghost-figure leads both the gang of thieves and the villagers to a hideout deep in the forest where several children who went missing from the village are recovered from a gang of militants, after which the entirety of villagers bows in front of Tabrez, who realizes that he made a grave mistake trying to deceive the villagers. Humbled by their gesture of 5-6 lakh rupees as a means of arranging film equipment, he decides that he will leave behind part of the looted treasure for the villagers, even as he trains the villagers in acting, among whom is the local cop, Inspector Dhurinder, as the train has been delayed by a week.

With everything set in motion on the day of the hijack, trouble seems to brew with the arrival of Singh, Jagtap, Chatterjee and Mukherjee, even as Tabrez finds his mother joining in after finding out through the unwitting Aanya. However, while he succeeds in tying up the four officers and escaping after successfully executing the entire caper, Singh recovers and slaps Dhurinder, informing the stunned villagers that the director who they met is a wanted criminal.

Along with his gang, Tabrez meets up with the Johri brothers and declares that he will leave behind a portion of the loot for the villagers, but the rather irked twins fool them and escape. Meanwhile, Dhurinder holds Tabrez at gunpoint until Singh arrives, and the entire village alter assembles with Tabrez against the officers in attendance, with the Judge deciding that only the guilt-ridden Tabrez be jailed, but while he misinterprets his sentence as that of 7 years, he is shocked to find that it is instead 60 years.

Outside the courtroom, Tabrez instructs Burger, Dollar and Soda to complete the film, titled Bharat Ka Khazana, and release it. At the premiere, he arrives handcuffed, but is found missing and thus escaped after Chatterjee and Mukherjee find Bunty in shackles instead. Singh realizes he has failed and is shocked.

Meanwhile, the Johri brothers are stunned to find Tabrez aboard their plane, with Burger, Dollar and Soda revealed to have hijacked it. Finding the twins adamant against his will, Tabrez throws them out with a parachute at their back. A song sequence, in the end, features Aatish finally receiving an Oscar award from the sensational actor Anil Kapoor, Aanya endorsing a hair removal cream.

Cast

 Akshay Kumar as Tabrez Mirza Khan a.k.a. Tees Maar Khan a.k.a. TMK / Manoj "Day" Ramalin 
 Akshaye Khanna as Aatish Kapoor, a talented but greedy superstar who aspires for an Oscar award 
 Katrina Kaif as Aanya Khan, Tabrez's Girlfriend and a struggling - aspiring actress 
 Murli Sharma as CBI officer Mukherjee
 Aman Verma as CBI officer Chatterjee
 Raghu Ram and Rajiv Laxman as the Johri Brothers, a pair of Siamese twins and international criminals wanted by the Interpol
 Arya Babbar as Inspector Dhurinder
 Sachin Khedekar as Commissioner Khadhak Singh
 Vijay Patkar as Inspector Jagtap
 Shashank Vyas as a villager
 Ali Asgar as Burger, Tabrez's sidekick
 Dharampal as Dollar, Tabrez's sidekick
 Vijay Maurya as Soda, Tabrez's sidekick
 Mia Uyeda in a special appearance as Malavika Shukla, aviation minister Pankaj Shukla's daughter
 Apara Mehta as Tabrez's mother 
 Anjan Srivastav as Nana Ganphule, the village chief of Dhulia
 Shashi Kiran as a villager
 Avtar Gill as Subedaar
 Sudhir Pandey as Bunty Baweja, Aatish's manager
 Anvita Dutt Guptan in a special appearance as a press reporter at the film screening
 Viju Khote as Judge
 Vishal Dadlani in a special appearance as a film director in the song "Sheila Ki Jawani"
 Manish Paul in a special appearance as Master India, the second alternative for the Johri brothers who was ruled out by Commissioner Singh 
 Anil Kapoor in a special appearance in the song "Happy Ending"
 Bhushan Kumar in a special appearance in the song "Happy Ending"
 Salman Khan in a special appearance as himself in the song "Wallah Re Wallah"
 Chunky Pandey in a special appearance as himself
 Komal Nahta in a special appearance as himself
 Sanjay Dutt as Narrator
 Ishtiyak Khan as villager
 Shakti Mohan as dancer in title track

Production
Priyanka Chopra was earlier rumoured to play the part of Aanya, but that rumour was later dropped after Katrina Kaif was chosen to play the female lead.

The script is penned by director Farah Khan's husband, Shirish Kunder. Sanjay Dutt was confirmed to play the role of the narrator for the film. Farah stated in an interview that she wanted someone with a voice which people can recognise even in their sleep.

An entire train was made and 500m track laid for Rs. 7.5 million to shoot the climax scenes.
Dharmesh Yelande was choreographed in this film.

Release
Tees Maar Khan premiered in the UK, Fiji and Canada on 22 December 2010.

Reception

Critical response
Anupama Chopra of NDTV wrote, "Tees Maar Khan, adapted from After the Fox, by writers Shrish and Ashmit Kunder, is disappointingly limp and insistently low on IQ. The film has little of the effervescence and flair of a typical Farah Khan film," giving it 2/5 stars. Aseem Chhabra of Rediff.com, who rated the film 1.5/5, stated, "Even at two hours, the film feels like one long and tedious exercise in bad humour. Some people laughed during the screening I attended in New York City. However, most sat with glum faces, in a sense of disbelief ..... How could a talented(..?) person like Khan make such an unfunny film?" Behindwoods review board gave the film a two out of five-star rating and quoted "So is Tees Maar Khan watchable? Good Question. Very good question. The answer is 'Yes' if you are in the mood to celebrate. But watch it in theatres as the fun is only when there is a crowd laughing along with you. The second half can have you in splits." Taran Adarsh of Bollywood Hungama gave a modest rating of 3/5 in his review and said, "Farah Khan's brand new outing Tees Maar Khan will make the most absurd, bizarre and wacky cinema of yore pale in comparison. Not just your cell phone, even your brain needs to be put on 'switched off' mode at the commencement of this film." Nikhat Kazmi of the Times of India awarded 2.5/5 stars while commenting, "Sadly, Tees Maar Khan begins as a spoof and remains a spoof, till the very end. All the characters end up as mere caricatures and completely fail to build up an emotional quotient in the film." Yahoo! Movies gave the film 1.5/5 stars. Komal Nahta of Koimoi.com gave it a rating of 2/5 and stated, "Too much of farcical comedy; lack of emotions; over-the-top characters; unbelievable script ..... Tees Maar Khan is definitely a disappointment, but it will bring back the invested money and a bit more." Aniruddha Guha of Daily News and Analysis gave the film 2 stars and remarked, "Even Sheila can’t make Tees Maar Khan watchable ... Though the story is interesting (Neil Simon of After The Fox should ideally get the credit), the writing is so pedestrian and Farah Khan’s presentation so lacklustre that you wonder how the film was greenlighted at all." Gaurav Malani of The Economic Times gave 2 stars saying, "To sum up in Tees Maar Khans trademark style of dialogue delivery, Akshay Kumar se zara hatke comedy expect karna aur Akshaye Khanna se kuch bhi expect karna bekaar hain. Tees Maar Khan doesn’t even guarantee thirty good laughs in its three-hour runtime." Kaveree Bamzai of India Today rated it 2½/5 saying, "It's an oddly half-hearted film from a woman [Farah Khan] who is never known to do anything in half measure." Rajeev Masand of CNN-IBN rated the movie 2/5 suggesting, "If you’re outraged by such low-brow humour, 'Tees Maar Khan' is going to be a long, hard slog for you." Raja Sen of Rediff.com gave a 2 out of 5 star rating explaining that "Tees Maar Khan looks better, is better acted, and provides far more laughs than the standard Bollywood comic project, but judging Farah by the bar she's set for herself, it has to be termed a disappointment." The Hindu in its review said "So there are at least a dozen gags that will make you laugh but the point is from Farah, we expect a lot, qualitatively and quantitatively, more."

Box office

India

Tees Maar Khan took a 100% opening at most multiplexes across India. The film collected  on its first day of business, becoming the second biggest opening day grosser of all time across India for Hindi movies after Dabangg. On the second day of its release, the film netted , taking the two-day total to  nett. Tees Maar Khan collected about  nett at the end of its first weekend, thus becoming the second biggest opening weekend net grosser of all time across India for Hindi movies. Despite its initial huge run at the box office, there had been many negative reports about the film. Box Office India reported, "Tees Maar Khan has not matched the expectations from the film prior to release but it is not that bad either as it is not as if the film just collapsed. The opening weekend collections are around 15% lower than sensible expectations." Tees Maar Khan underwent a heavy 65% fall on Monday, its fourth day of business, as it collected . The film further suffered a big drop on Tuesday, its fifth day of business, collecting around  nett, taking the five-day business to  nett. Tees Maar Khan went on to collect  nett in its first week of release. The film showed an 85% decline in the second week, on its eight-day of business, as compared to its first day. In its second weekend, the film collected around  nett, taking the ten days collections to  nett. The film collected about  nett in second week, taking the total collections in two weeks to  nett. The film collected   nett in its third week, taking the total domestic collections  nett.

Overseas

In the overseas market, the film grossed around $2.5 million from its extended weekend, which, according to Box Office India, "is below par for a big film". The breakdown included £320,000 from United Kingdom in 5 days, $750,000 from North America in 5 days, $500,000 from United Arab Emirates in 3 days and $175,000 from Pakistan in 3 days. The nett collections till the end of the second weekend e were: £625,000 from United Kingdom, $1,030,000 from North America, $775,000 from UAE, and $265,000 from Australia.

Awards and nominations

IIFA Awards
Nominated
 IIFA Best Female Playback - Sunidhi Chauhan for Sheila Ki Jawani

Zee Cine Awards

Won
Zee Cine Award for Best Choreography Award - Farah Khan for "Sheila Ki Jawani"

Nominated
Zee Cine Award for Best Track of the Year - "Sheila Ki Jawani"
Zee Cine Award for Best Music Director - Vishal / Shekhar
Zee Cine Award for Best Playback Singer - Male - Sonu Nigam for "Tees Maar Khan"
Zee Cine Award for Best Playback Singer - Female - Sunidhi Chauhan for "Sheila Ki Jawani"
Zee Cine Award for Best Lyricist - Vishal Dadlani for "Sheila Ki Jawani"
Zee Cine Award for Best Actor in a Supporting Role – Male - Akshaye Khanna
Zee Cine Award for Best Cinematography - P.S. Vinod

Filmfare Awards
Won
Filmfare Best Playback Singer - Female - Sunidhi Chauhan for Sheila Ki Jawani
Filmfare Best Choreography Award - Farah Khan for Sheila Ki Jawani

Star Screen Awards
Won
Best Actress (Popular Choice) - Katrina Kaif
Nominated
Screen Best Female Playback for Sheila Ki Jawani (Sunidhi Chauhan)

Apsara Film & Television Producers Guild Awards
Won
Best Female Playback for Sheila Ki Jawani Sunidhi Chauhan

Stardust Awards
Won
Star of the Year – Male - Akshay Kumar

Mirchi Music Awards
Won
Listeners' Choice Song of the Year for "Sheila Ki Jawani"
Nominated
 Song of The Year for "Sheila Ki Jawani"
 Female Vocalist of The Year - Sunidhi Chauhan for "Sheila Ki Jawani"
 Best Item Song of the Year for "Sheila Ki Jawani"

Other Awards
Won
 GIMA award Best Female playback for Sheila Ki Jawani
 Airtel Dancing Super Star for Sheila Ki Jawani - Katrina Kaif

Soundtrack

The music of the film is composed by the music duo of Vishal–Shekhar and one song from debutant music composer Shirish Kunder for the title track. Lyrics are penned by Vishal Dadlani, Anvita Dutt Guptan and Shirish Kunder. The music was launched on 14 November 2010. The entire cast and crew travelled on a train booked from Mumbai to Lonavala for the music launch. Sonu Nigam has given 54 voices for the title track of the film. The song 'Sheila Ki Jawani' became a chartbuster and fetched Sunidhi Chauhan a Filmfare Award and many other awards.

Track listing

Sequel
Even before the film was released, Khan and Kunder had planned on converting the film into a franchise, and Kunder was reportedly writing a sequel, with Kumar again in the titular role. However, after his second collaboration with the couple, the comedy film Joker, was also poorly received and was dubbed a disaster, Kumar reportedly avoided further collaborations with Khan, and the sequel was shelved.

References

External links

2010s Hindi-language films
2010 films
2010 action comedy films
2010s crime comedy films
Indian action comedy films
Films directed by Farah Khan
Hari Om Entertainment films
Films scored by Vishal–Shekhar
Indian remakes of Italian films
Films based on works by Cesare Zavattini
UTV Motion Pictures films
Indian heist films
2010s heist films
Indian crime comedy films
2010 comedy films